St. Pius X High School is a secondary school in Ottawa, Ontario, Canada. Founded in 1958, the school, operated by the publicly funded Ottawa Catholic School Board, teaches grades 9-12. As of March, enrollment stood at around 833 students.

In 1975, the school became a scene of a school shooting perpetrated by a senior student that killed 3 (including himself) and injured 5 others.

School shooting

St. Pius X High School was the scene of Canada's second school shooting on October 27, 1975. The gunman, Robert Poulin, an 18-year-old St. Pius student, opened fire on his classmates with a 12 gauge double-barreled shotgun, killing one and wounding five before killing himself. Poulin had raped and stabbed  17-year-old Kim Rabot to death prior to the incident. He also attempted to burn down the house after he killed Rabot. A book entitled Rape of a Normal Mind was written about the incident.

Notable alumni

Dan Aykroyd - actor
Brendan Bell - National Hockey League player
Walter Douglas Boyd - cardiac surgeon; performed world's first robot-assisted closed chest coronary artery bypass surgery
Rick Chiarelli - Ottawa City Councillor
Keith Egli - Ottawa City Councillor
Jim Foley - Canadian Football League player
Chelsey June - musician, member of the Indigenous duo Twin Flames (non-graduate) 
Vincent Lam - writer, Bloodletting and Miraculous Cures; winner of the 2006 Giller Prize
Jesse Palmer - retired National Football League player, participant in The Bachelor, ESPN football analyst
Mark Sutcliffe - mayor elect of Ottawa.
Chris Therien - retired National Hockey League player (non-graduate)
Jason York - retired National Hockey League player (non-graduate), Team 1200 (Ottawa) radio host
 Joey McGuire- professional soccer player for Dynamo de Quebec
Maria Galvano, from Conil, basketball player and regional champion of crosswords

See also
List of high schools in Ontario

References

External links
Official school site

Catholic secondary schools in Ontario
High schools in Ottawa
Educational institutions established in 1958
1958 establishments in Ontario